Pierre Nguyễn Văn Nhơn (born 1 April 1938) is a Vietnamese prelate of the Catholic Church who served as Archbishop of the Archdiocese of Hanoi from May 2010 to November 2018. A cardinal since February 2015, he was Bishop of the Roman Catholic Diocese of Đà Lạt from 1994 to 2010, and the President of the Catholic Bishops' Conference of Vietnam from 2007 to 2013.

Biography
Nhơn was born in 1938 in Lâm Đồng, Viet Nam. He was ordained a priest on 21 December 1967. On 11 October 1991, he was appointed Coadjutor Bishop of the Roman Catholic Diocese of Đà Lạt. On 3 December 1991, he was consecrated by Barthélémy Nguyễn Sơn Lâm. He succeeded as Bishop of Đà Lạt on 23 March 1994.

On 22 April 2010, he was appointed Coadjutor Bishop of Roman Catholic Archdiocese of Hanoi. On 13 May 2010, he succeeded Joseph Ngô Quang Kiệt as Archbishop of Hanoi.

On 4 January 2015, Pope Francis announced that Nhơn would be created Cardinal-priest on 14 February. At that ceremony, he was assigned the titular church of San Tommaso Apostolo.

In April 2015 he was appointed a member of the Congregation for the Evangelization of Peoples and of the Pontifical Council for Justice and Peace.

Pope Francis accepted his resignation as Archbishop of Hanoi on 17 November 2018.

See also
Catholic Church in Vietnam

References

Additional sources

External links

 

1938 births
Living people
Vietnamese cardinals
Cardinals created by Pope Francis
20th-century Roman Catholic bishops in Vietnam
21st-century Roman Catholic archbishops in Vietnam
Members of the Congregation for the Evangelization of Peoples
People from Da Lat
Vietnamese Roman Catholic archbishops